Ákos Kalmár (born 11 January 2000) is a Hungarian swimmer.

In 2018, he represented Hungary at the 2018 Summer Youth Olympics held in Buenos Aires, Argentina.

In 2019, he represented Hungary at the 2019 World Aquatics Championships held in Gwangju, South Korea. He competed in the men's 800 metre freestyle and men's 1500 metre freestyle events. He also competed in the men's 4 × 200 metre freestyle relay event.

References

External links 

Living people
2000 births
Hungarian male swimmers
Hungarian male freestyle swimmers
Swimmers at the 2018 Summer Youth Olympics
Swimmers at the 2020 Summer Olympics
Olympic swimmers of Hungary
People from Baja, Hungary
Sportspeople from Bács-Kiskun County